James Finn Jr. (born December 9, 1976) is a former American football fullback. He was drafted by the Chicago Bears as the final pick of the 1999 NFL Draft. He played college football at the University of Pennsylvania.

High school career
Finn was born in Teaneck, New Jersey and grew up in Fair Lawn, New Jersey. He attended Bergen Catholic High School in Oradell, New Jersey, where he was involved in both football and wrestling. An All-State pick in both sports, he was the 189-pound class state champion and posted a 33–2 record as a senior. Because no Division I-A recruiters were seeking him, Finn sought a Division I-AA program and committed with the University of Pennsylvania.

College career
Finn was a four-year letterman while playing college football at the University of Pennsylvania, where he accumulated 2,277 rushing yards, which ranks as the fourth-highest total in school history. He also scored 180 points for fifth on the all-time list. He was an All-Ivy League player as a senior and junior. In his senior season, Finn set school records for yards, rushing attempts, and rushing touchdowns.

Penn first experimented with having Finn play both offense and defense on October 18, 1997, against Columbia. In that game, Finn ran for 138 yards on 24 carries including one touchdown for 15 yards but fumbled on Columbia's 3-yard line on a 50-yard run. With the 24–7 win, Penn beat Columbia for the first time since 1994.

In addition to being named an All-Ivy Team member, Finn was named Player of the Year. He also holds school records for most rushing attempts, rushing yards, and touchdowns in a game. Before being converted permanently into a fullback, Finn briefly played as a safety, even starting a few games as a sophomore. While at Penn, Finn became a member of the Sigma Chi fraternity. Finn also attended the Wharton School at Penn and graduated with a degree in finance in 1999.

Professional career

Pre-draft

Playing history
Finn was drafted as the final pick of the 1999 NFL Draft (nicknamed Mr. Irrelevant) by the Chicago Bears. He was waived and spent time on their practice squad. Finn signed with the Indianapolis Colts in early 2000 where he ran for 44 yards in six rushing attempts and 10 receptions over three seasons. In 2003, Finn signed with the New York Giants. In his Giants career, Finn had 21 rushing yards from five attempts. He saw more action as a receiver out of the backfield, with 325 receiving yards and 42 receptions.

In 2005, Finn played in all 16 regular season games with 13 starts including the NFC National Football League playoffs wild card game against the Carolina Panthers. His blocks for Tiki Barber helped Barber rush for a franchise-record 1,860 yards. Finn was primarily a blocking fullback for the Giants.

Finn missed the entire 2007 New York Giants season after being placed on injured reserve. That year, he became a Super Bowl champion when the Giants won Super Bowl XLII. After the season, Finn was cut due to nagging injuries and the emergence of Madison Hedgecock.

Finn and Brandon Stokley are the only players in NFL history to have caught an offensive pass from both Eli Manning and Peyton Manning. Many players caught interceptions from both brothers.

Personal life
He is the son of James and Jane Finn. Finn married actress Rosa Blasi on February 14, 2004, in Maui. They had one child and divorced in 2008.

Finn is a resident in Los Angeles County, California. He has also lived in Fair Lawn, New Jersey.

Finn was a named plaintiff in one of the lawsuits filed by former NFL players against the league, alleging that the NFL had failed to warn its players about the risk of long term damage from repeated concussions incurred from playing football.

References

External links
 

Pro-Football-Reference.com

1976 births
Living people
American football fullbacks
Bergen Catholic High School alumni
Chicago Bears players
Indianapolis Colts players
New York Giants players
Penn Quakers football players
People from Fair Lawn, New Jersey
People from Hermosa Beach, California
People from Teaneck, New Jersey
Players of American football from California
Players of American football from New Jersey
Sportspeople from Hackensack, New Jersey
Sportspeople from Los Angeles County, California
Wharton School of the University of Pennsylvania alumni